Mondomondo is an island in the Solomon Islands.

It is located in the Western Province.

See also

References

Islands of the Solomon Islands
Western Province (Solomon Islands)